Abubakar Sani Sambo  (Born 31 July 1955) is a Nigerian Mechanical engineer, former Director-General of the Energy Commission of Nigeria (ECN),  Chair of the Nigerian Member Committee of the World Energy Council (WEC), Africa Region and former Vice-Chancellor of Abubakar Tafawa Balewa University, Nigeria.

Early life and education
He was born on 31 July 1955 in Zaria, Kaduna State, Nigeria.
He obtained a Bachelor of Science (B.sc) degree in mechanical engineering from the prestigious Ahmadu Bello University, Zaria in 1979 with a first class honour.
In 1983, he obtained a doctorate degree, Ph.D. in mechanical engineering from the University of Sussex, United Kingdom.
After he received his Ph.D, he returned to Nigeria to join the services of Bayero University, Kano where he rose to the position of a senior lecturer in 1989 and was appointed a professor in energy studies at the same University.
He was appointed as the vice-chancellor of Abubakar Tafawa Balewa University in 1995 and served in this capacity for two terms (1995-2004).
He is the incumbent director-general and chief executive of the Energy Commission of Nigeria (ECN) and vice chairman of the World Energy Council (WEC), Africa Region, since November 2007.

Awards 
 Officer of the Order of the Niger, OON

Fellowships and membership
Fellow of the Nigerian Academy of Engineering
 Fellow of the Nigerian Society of Engineers
Member of the Council for the Regulation of Engineering in Nigeria (COREN)
International Solar Energy Society (ISES) (1986)
International Energy Foundation (IEF)(1990)
Member of the World Renewable Energy Network (WREN) (1992).
Member of the Solar Energy Society of Nigeria
Member of the Nigerian Academy of Science

See also
List of notable engineers in Nigeria
List of vice chancellors in Nigeria

References

Nigerian engineers
Living people
1938 births
Abubakar Tafawa Balewa University people
Ahmadu Bello University alumni
Academic staff of Bayero University Kano